Sevier County is a county located in the U.S. state of Arkansas. As of the 2020 census, the population was 15,839. The county seat is De Queen. Sevier County is Arkansas's 16th county, formed on October 17, 1828, and named for Ambrose Sevier, U.S. Senator from Arkansas. On November 3, 2020, voters in Sevier County, AR approved alcohol sales by a vote of 3,499 (67.31 percent) to 1,699 (32.69 percent).

History
Sevier County was organized on October 17, 1828, under legislative authority. It was formed from Hempstead and Miller Counties. Five days later on October 22, 1828, the legislature expanded the county's border, incorporating more land south of the Red River. Hempstead, Miller and Crawford Counties as well as the Choctaw Nation in Indian Territory bound Sevier County. The establishment of Sevier County became effective on November 1, 1828.
 
The county seat has undergone several changes since Sevier County was organized.  The first county seat was Paraclifta.  After an area of Sevier County was carved away to become part of newly created Little River County in 1867, Paraclifta was no longer centrally located. Three members of a local prominent family—James, William, and Matthew Locke—offered  of land, and Royal Appleton offered  for the site of a new county seat to be named Lockesburg. A petition to establish Lockesburg as the county seat was approved by the county court on January 18, 1869.  After a number of local citizens were unwilling to sell land for a route for the Kansas City, Pittsburg, and Gulf Railroad in the late 1890s, the route was laid down through what would become the town of De Queen instead of Lockesburg. In 1905, the county seat was moved to De Queen.

Geography

Known as "The Land of Lakes", "The Land of Fruits and Flowers" and "The Home of Friendly People," the county has five lakes within a 35-mile (56 km) radius, five rivers and mountain streams and forests.

Notable people
Current or former residents of Sevier County include:
Collin Raye, country music singer.
Wes Watkins, U.S.Congressman (Republican- Oklahoma) lived for a time in De Queen as a child.

Major highways
 Future Interstate 49
 U.S. Highway 59
 U.S. Highway 70
 U.S. Highway 71
 U.S. Highway 371
 Highway 24
 Highway 27
 Highway 41

Adjacent counties
Polk County (north)
Howard County (east)
Hempstead County (southeast)
Little River County (south)
McCurtain County, Oklahoma (west)

National protected area
 Pond Creek National Wildlife Refuge

Demographics

2020 census

As of the 2020 United States census, there were 15,839 people, 5,885 households, and 4,279 families residing in the county.

2000 census
As of the 2000 census, there were 15,757 people, 5,708 households, and 4,223 families residing in the county. The population density was 28 people per square mile (11/km2). There were 6,434 housing units at an average density of 11 per square mile (4/km2). The racial makeup of the county was 79.61% White, 4.94% Black or African American, 1.82% Native American, 0.13% Asian, 0.06% Pacific Islander, 11.84% from other races, and 1.61% from two or more races. 19.72% of the population were Hispanic or Latino of any race. 17.32% reported speaking Spanish at home.

There were 5,708 households, out of which 36.40% had children under the age of 18 living with them, 59.30% were married couples living together, 10.00% had a female householder with no husband present, and 26.00% were non-families. 22.80% of all households were made up of individuals, and 11.00% had someone living alone who was 65 years of age or older. The average household size was 2.73 and the average family size was 3.19.

In the county, the population was spread out, with 28.20% under the age of 18, 9.50% from 18 to 24, 27.70% from 25 to 44, 21.30% from 45 to 64, and 13.20% who were 65 years of age or older. The median age was 34 years. For every 100 females there were 99.10 males. For every 100 females age 18 and over, there were 97.00 males.

The median income for a household in the county was $30,144, and the median income for a family was $34,560. Males had a median income of $25,709 versus $17,666 for females. The per capita income for the county was $14,122. About 14.40% of families and 19.20% of the population were below the poverty line, including 26.90% of those under age 18 and 14.20% of those age 65 or over.

Government
Over the past few election cycles,  Sevier County has trended heavily towards the GOP. The last Democrat (as of 2020) to carry this county was Arkansas native Bill Clinton in 1996.

Communities

Cities
 De Queen (county seat)
 Horatio
 Lockesburg

Towns
 Ben Lomond
 Gillham

Townships

 Bear Creek (contains most of De Queen)
 Ben Lomond (contains Ben Lomond)
 Buckhorn
 Clear Creek (contains Horatio)
 Jefferson
 Mill Creek
 Mineral (contains Gillham)
 Monroe (contains small part of De Queen)
 Paraclifta
 Red Colony (contains Lockesburg)
 Saline
 Washington

Source:

See also
 List of lakes in Sevier County, Arkansas
 National Register of Historic Places listings in Sevier County, Arkansas

References

External links
 Sevier County, Arkansas entry on the Encyclopedia of Arkansas History & Culture

 
1828 establishments in Arkansas Territory
Populated places established in 1828